The men's team competition of the table tennis event at the 2021 Southeast Asian Games will be held from 13th to 15th May at the Hải Dương Gymnasium in Hải Dương, Vietnam.

Schedule
All times are Vietnam Time (UTC+07:00).

Results

Preliminary round

Group A

Group B

Knockout round

Semifinals

Gold medal match

References

External links
 

Men's team